Moskvitch (also written as Moskvich, Moskvič, or Moskwitsch) is a Soviet/Russian automobile brand produced by AZLK from 1946 to 1991 and by OAO Moskvitch from 1991 to 2001 and later returned to production in 2022. The current article incorporates information about both the brand and the joint-stock successor of AZLK.

OAO Moskvitch is a privatized venture name given to the former factory to avoid legal issues after the dissolution of the Soviet Union in 1991. Since the factory had no assembly branches outside Russia after 1991, its name is largely used today to refer to the building located in the lower eastern part of Moscow.

The word moskvich itself translates as "a native of Moscow, a Moscovite". It was used to point out the original location of the cars manufactured there.

History

Early years

In 1929, the construction of Moscow Automotive Plant began with initial production of 24,000 vehicles. Between 1940 and 1941, it built the two-door compact car KIM 10-50 and its "phaeton" version KIM 10-51. In 1941, after having produced under 1,000 units, the plant was evacuated to Ural and the entire production converted for the manufacture of military equipment during World War II.

After the war, the production of the KIM cars was not resumed, and instead, the Soviet Union acquired an Opel manufacturing line from Brandenburg in Soviet occupation zone of Germany to manufacture the modified Opel Kadett under the name Moskvitch-400 in December 1946. In the 1950s and afterwards, the factory, now called MZMA (Moskovsky Zavod Malolitrazhnykh Avtomobiley, that is, "Moscow Compact Car Factory"), replaced it with its own cars developed by Soviet engineers: the second postwar generation consisting of the Moskvitch-402–407 and 410, then by the more advanced Moskvitch 408, 412, and 2140. The M-407 was the first Soviet automotive export to be truly successful in the West. Up to half of all M-407 production was exported for a number of years, mainly to the Eastern Bloc countries, Norway, Finland, and France. Later models were also sold in Great Britain, Finland, and Norway, for instance, and in 1968, 55% of production was for export. In 1969, the factory changed its name to AZLK (Avtomobilny Zavod imeni Leninskogo Komsomola, which means "Automobile Factory in honor of Komsomol Leninist Communist Youth Union").

In 1986, the Moskvitch-2141 Aleko became available for the first time. It was influenced by the Simca 1307 (which had also been badged as the Chrysler/Talbot Alpine, and under other names, in western markets). It was upgraded and restyled during the period of its production. It was powered by the 1.5 L UZAM used in the M-412 model and VAZ-2106 1.6 L in-line, four-cylinder engines, which had by then had been used in several LADA models. Aleko was different from any model the factory had made previously; it was larger and more luxurious, made with more comfort, safety, and aerodynamics in mind. The new car had such features as front-wheel drive, a hatchback body style, MacPherson strut front suspension and torsion-crank rear suspension. It had rack-and-pinion steering and a collapsible steering column. The 1.8-liter gasoline engine for the new car was planned, but never materialized, as was also the case with a diesel version. In the early 1990s, AZLK still remained one of the largest auto companies in the USSR. Design and experimental work were prepared to create a new model car (sedan M-2142) and an engine plant. However, after the dissolution of the Soviet Union, due to a financial crisis, disruptions in the work of the company, and financial mismanagement, the engine plant was not finished and the Moskvitch company fell into decline.

OAO Moskvitch
The factory, which had been renamed to OAO Moskvitch (Moskvitch Joint-Stock Company) in the early 1990s, filed for bankruptcy in 2002 and ceased production. Unfinished bodyshells remained on the production line in various stages of completion, while furniture, computers, office supplies, and documents remained in the plant's administration building. Several attempts to restart production had been made over the next 3 years, but none was successful.

A portion of the abandoned plant was acquired by Avtoframos (later renamed as Renault Russia), a joint venture between the City of Moscow and French automaker Renault. In 2005, Avtoframos commenced assembly of Renault Logan sedans from imported knock-down kits. It later became a wholly owned subsidiary of Renault.

The bankruptcy of OAO Moskvitch was officially announced in 2006, and the company was liquidated the following year. As of 2016, over a million Moskvitch cars remained on Russian roads.

In 2015, Renault announced they had begun the process for obtaining the Moskvitch rights in Russia.

2022 revival
In May 2022, as a result of Western sanctions against Russia, Renault sold its Moscow plant to the Moscow city government which intended to nationalize the facility for renewed production of vehicles under the Moskvitch name.

Moskvitch presented its new range of models on July 6, 2022: a sedan and 3 SUVs, Model I having both a fuel version as well as an electric version. The cars have names made up of Roman numerals, from I and II to IV. All models are rebadged cars from Chinese manufacturer JAC.

On October 20, the mayor of Moscow, Sergey Sobyanin, said that the production of Moskvich vehicles will resume in December at Renault's former factory in Moscow, now renamed the Moscow Automobile Factory Moskvich, which has been inactive after Renault decided to leave the Russian market.

On December 26, 2022, the Moskvitch 3 and Moskvitch 3e went on sale in Russia.

Models
 Moskvitch 3 (2022–present)
 Moskvitch 3e (2022–present)

See also
 List of Moskvitch vehicles
 Automobile model numbering system in the Soviet Union and Russia

References

External links

 New Moskvich web-site 
 OAO «Москвич». Автомобильный завод АЗЛК 
 Moskwitsch Oldtimer

 
Vehicle manufacturing companies established in 1930
Vehicle manufacturing companies disestablished in 2006
Defunct motor vehicle manufacturers of Russia
Soviet automobiles
Soviet brands
Russian brands
Cars of Russia
1930 establishments in Russia
2022 establishments in Russia